The renin receptor also known as ATPase H(+)-transporting lysosomal accessory protein 2, or the prorenin receptor, is a protein that in humans is encoded by the ATP6AP2 gene.

Function 

The renin receptor binds renin and prorenin. Binding of renin to this receptor induces the conversion of angiotensinogen to angiotensin I.

This protein is associated with adenosine triphosphatases (ATPases). Proton-translocating ATPases have fundamental roles in energy conservation, secondary active transport, acidification of intracellular compartments, and cellular pH homeostasis. There are three classes of ATPases- F, P, and V. The vacuolar (V-type) ATPases have a transmembrane proton-conducting sector and an extramembrane catalytic sector. This protein has been found associated with the transmembrane sector of the V-type ATPases.

References

Further reading

External links
 
 

Transmembrane receptors